Paul Anthony Hopkins (22 March 1951 – 31 August 2014) was a British aviator, and the former Chief Test Pilot of British Aerospace in the 1990s.

Career
He joined the RAF in 1969 and flew the Harrier throughout the 1970s. He left the RAF in 1985. In 1996 he tested the BAE Systems and SAAB joint venture Saab JAS 39 Gripen.

British Aerospace

He became Chief Test Pilot of British Aerospace in 1997. He stopped flying in 2005.

He was the first to go at twice the speed of sound with the Eurofighter 2000 (DA2 or ZH588) in February 1998. The Eurofighter 2000 was a £40bn project. He was the first to refuel the aircraft, with a VC-10 tanker aircraft over the Irish Sea. At the time, Britain intended to buy 232 Eurofighter aircraft, and for the aircraft to enter service in 2002.

He was Project Pilot from 1985 to 1988 for the British Aerospace Hawk 200. He was the first to fly the Hawk Mk66 on 7 April 1989. He was the first to fly the Hawk 128, a BAE Systems Hawk with much-improved open architecture avionics and mission computers on Wednesday 27 July 2005 in Lancashire; the aircraft has a Rolls-Royce Turbomeca Adour Mk951 engine.

He became Project Director of the Advanced Jet Trainer (Hawk T2).

Personal life
He died on 31 August 2014. He died of Motor Neuron Disease. He lived in Lytham St Annes. He married Linda Finneron in July 1994 in Lancashire.

See also
 Timeline of the Eurofighter Typhoon
 Craig Penrice, Eurofighter project pilot from 2002 to 2003, and the first to fire an air-to-air missile (AIM-120 AMRAAM) from a Eurofighter (DA4 or ZH590) at the Deep Sea Range
 John Turner (pilot), Eurofighter project pilot from 1992 to 2000

References

1951 births
2014 deaths
British test pilots
Deaths from motor neuron disease
Neurological disease deaths in England
People from Lytham St Annes
Royal Air Force officers